George Affleck (born 1888 in Auchendinny, Scotland) was a footballer who played in the English Football League for Grimsby Town and Leeds City. Following his retirement, he became a football coach in Rotterdam.

References

Scottish footballers
Penicuik Athletic F.C. players
Leeds City F.C. players
Grimsby Town F.C. players
English Football League players
1888 births
Year of death missing
Association football defenders
Sportspeople from Midlothian